The Men's Volleyball tournament at the 2013 Mediterranean Games will be held in Mersin, Turkey from 21 June to 29 June 2013.

Competition Formula

The 7 teams will be divided into two pools and will play a round-robin tournament.

The top 4 teams progress to the Semi Finals.

Preliminary round

Pool A

Pool B

Elimination round

Championship bracket

Fifth place match

Semifinals

Bronze medal match

Gold medal match

Final standings

References

Men